The University of Michigan Rogel Cancer Center is a cancer research and treatment institution based in Ann Arbor, Michigan, United States. The Rogel Cancer Center is affiliated with the University of Michigan and Michigan Medicine.

History 
The Rogel Cancer Center was founded in 1986 at the University of Michigan. In 1988, it was designated as part of the National Cancer Institute cancer centers program. It received comprehensive cancer center status in 1991 and continues to be an NCI-designated comprehensive cancer center today.

From 1991-2018 it was known as the University of Michigan Comprehensive Cancer Center. The center was renamed the Rogel Cancer Center in 2018 in recognition of a $150 million commitment from Richard and Susan Rogel.

The Rogel Cancer Center is ranked among the top cancer programs by U.S. News & World Report. In addition to being an NCI-designated comprehensive cancer center, it is a founding member of the National Comprehensive Cancer Network

The center’s founding director was Max Wicha, M.D., a medical oncologist and researcher who was part of the team to first discover cancer stem cells in a solid tumor. Wicha served as director for 27 years. He was succeeded by Theodore Lawrence, M.D., Ph.D., in 2015 and by Eric Fearon, M.D., Ph.D., in 2016. Fearon is a nationally recognized investigator in cancer genetics whose research has led to a greater understanding of the gene defects that cause colon and rectal cancer to develop and spread.

Scientific programs 
Research at the Rogel Cancer Center is divided into seven basic, clinical and population science programs:

 Cancer Biology
 Cancer Genetics
 Cancer Hematopoiesis and Immunology
 Developmental Therapeutics
 Translational and Clinical Research
 Cancer Epidemiology and Prevention
 Health Behavior and Outcomes

Accomplishments 
Significant cancer research discoveries from the Rogel Cancer Center include:

 Identifying the TMPSS2:ERG gene fusion, which is seen in 50% of all prostate cancers
 Developing new potential treatments for graft-versus-host disease
 Creating new mouse models to facilitate research in cancer biology
 Identifying cancer stem cells in numerous solid tumors and elucidating how these small number of cells within a tumor are what fuels its growth and spread
 Assessing the long-term financial issues that cancer treatment causes for many patients
 Developing new ways of giving radiation therapy to improve the efficacy while reducing impact on normal tissue

References 

Cancer hospitals